The 2014 WNBA season is the 17th season for the Tulsa Shock of the Women's National Basketball Association. It is their fifth in Tulsa. Tulsa still hasn't made the playoffs after moving from Detroit.

Transactions

WNBA Draft
The following are the Shock's selections in the 2014 WNBA Draft.

Roster

Staff
Head coach- Fred Williams
Assistant coach- Bridget Pettis
Assistant coach- Ed Baldwin
Athletic trainer- Allison Russell

Schedule
The schedule can be viewed here

Season standings

References

External links
 Tulsa Shock 2014 Schedule - Shock Home and Away - ESPN

Tulsa Shock seasons
Tulsa
2014 in sports in Oklahoma